Presidential elections are scheduled to be held in Somaliland some time in November 2024, the fourth direct presidential elections since 2003.

According to the constitution of Somaliland, presidential elections are to be held every 5 years. Incumbent President Muse Bihi Abdi of Kulmiye is eligible to seek a second term in office, having first been elected in 2017. He is yet to state whether he will chose to do so. The two opposition parties of Waddani and the Justice and Welfare Party are also yet to announce their respective candidates for the presidency.

On September 24, 2022, the National Electoral Commission announced that the presidential election initially scheduled for November 13, 2022 has been postponed to July 2023. The upper house of the parliament of Somaliland, known as the Guurti voted on October 1, 2022, to postpose the election by two years instead of the nine months previously recommended by the National Electoral Commission, effectively scheduling the election for November 2024.

References

Elections in Somaliland
Somaliland
2022 in Somaliland